Alan Gordon (born October 16, 1981) is an American former professional soccer player. In the majority of his career, Gordon was mostly relied upon to make goals in games being substituted on the field.

Youth and college career

Gordon moved to Gilbert, Arizona in his mid-teens, and played two years of college soccer for Yavapai College, where he scored 39 goals in his two seasons, before a transfer to Oregon State University, where he won All-Pac-10 honors twice and scored 11 goals as a junior and 15 as a senior. Gordon scored 40 goals and 7 assists for the Oregon State Beavers, setting several program records.

Club career

2004–2010

Upon graduating, Gordon was drafted 53rd overall in the 2004 MLS SuperDraft's sixth round by Los Angeles Galaxy, but was not signed by the team. He signed with the Portland Timbers of the A-League and had a successful season, ending the regular season with 17 goals in 27 matches to tie Dante Washington for the league lead. Gordon was named the A-League Rookie of the Year and was a finalist for the MVP Award, having helped Portland to a first-place finish in the regular season. He was loaned back to the Galaxy, where he occupied a developmental roster slot, and made his MLS debut on September 25, 2004, as a substitute for Carlos Ruiz. Gordon earned a spot in the starting lineup for 2005, but only played in five matches due to reoccurring injuries, including a strained hip and groin early in the season.

He returned to the starting lineup during the 2006 season and scored his first MLS goal on August 26 against D.C. United. Gordon then scored twice the following week in a home match against the Kansas City Wizards and ended the season with four goals in league play. He scored three goals in the Galaxy's 2007 SuperLiga campaign, which ended with a second-place finish. During a friendly with Chelsea, Gordon was substituted for David Beckham's debut with the Galaxy. For much of the 2007 season, he was a third-string forward and also coached a girls youth team to supplement his MLS salary.

On April 26, 2008, Gordon scored two goals off the bench in the Galaxy's 5–2 victory over rivals Chivas USA. He finished 2008 with a career year. He scored five goals and seven assists, even though he was not a full-time starter.

2010–2018

In August 2010, he was traded to neighboring Chivas USA for allocation money just one match short of his 100 league appearances with the Galaxy, during which time he notched 16 goals. Following the 2010 season, he was selected by Vancouver Whitecaps FC in the 2010 MLS Expansion Draft, but was immediately traded back to Chivas USA, along with Alejandro Moreno, for allocation money and an international roster spot.

He was traded to Toronto FC ahead of the 2011 season in exchange for Nick LaBrocca. Gordon made his debut for Toronto on March 26 in a 2–0 home victory against Portland Timbers with both goals coming from Javier Martina. On April 2 Gordon scored his first goal for Toronto in a 1–1 tie against his former team Chivas. Gordon had a memorable return to The Home Depot Center on June 11 when he scored two goals against The Galaxy in a 2–2 thriller which saw two goals scored in injury time of the second half.

Following Toronto's designated player signing of Danny Koevermans, Gordon became a dispensable asset and was traded along with Jacob Peterson and Nana Attakora to the San Jose Earthquakes for Ryan Johnson, allocation money, and an international roster spot in July 2011. Gordon signed a new contract with San Jose in January 2012 and reunited with former Galaxy head coach Frank Yallop. Alan Gordon had a career best of 13 goals in 23 appearances with the Earthquakes that year, primarily as a late substitute alongside Chris Wondolowski and Steven Lenhart.

In April 2013, during a match with the Portland Timbers, Gordon was caught on camera using the word "faggot" in reference to Portland midfielder Will Johnson. Gordon was suspended for three matches following the incident, in addition to the one-match ban he received for drawing a red card in the 78th minute of the same match.

Gordon returned once again to Los Angeles when San Jose traded him to the Galaxy in August 2014 in exchange for allocation money. Gordon ended the season scoring five goals, four of them from off the bench.

Prior to the 2017 MLS season, Gordon announced that he would join the Colorado Rapids on a free agent deal.

On March 16, 2018, Gordon joined MLS side Chicago Fire. On October 28, 2018, Gordon announced that he would retire from playing professional soccer after their final game of the season against D.C. United.

International career
Gordon earned his first call-up to the United States men's national soccer team in August 2012 in advance of a friendly match against Mexico.  Gordon was again called up in October 2012 to prepare for the final two matches in the semifinal round of qualifying for the 2014 FIFA World Cup.  He made his first international appearance on October 12, 2012, as a substitute against Antigua and Barbuda, where he provided a critical assist to Eddie Johnson, who scored a 90th minute game-winning goal.

He was called into the squad for the 2013 Gold Cup, after the US advanced to the knockout stages. He did not play, however, as the US won the tournament.

He was also called into the squad for the 2015 Gold Cup, after the US advanced to the knockout rounds, replacing Jozy Altidore, who was still trying to recover from an injury. He came on as a late substitute for Aron Johannsson in the US's 2–1 loss the Jamaica in the semifinals but failed to make an impact.

Career statistics

 CCL play for 2013 San Jose has matches played in 2014 but was still the 2013 edition of the tourney

Honors

Team
Portland Timbers
 A-League The Commissioner's Cup (1): 2004

Los Angeles Galaxy
 MLS Cup (2): 2005, 2014
 US Open Cup (1): 2005
Toronto FC
 Canadian Championship (1): 2011

San Jose Earthquakes
 Supporters' Shield (1): 2012

Individual
 Major League Soccer Player of the Week (1): 2013
 A-League Rookie of the Year: 2004
 A-League Top Scorer (1): 2004

References

External links

 
 
 

1981 births
Living people
2013 CONCACAF Gold Cup players
2015 CONCACAF Gold Cup players
American soccer players
American expatriate soccer players
Association football forwards
Chicago Fire FC players
Chivas USA players
Colorado Rapids players
CONCACAF Gold Cup-winning players
Expatriate soccer players in Canada
LA Galaxy draft picks
LA Galaxy players
Major League Soccer players
Oregon State Beavers men's soccer players
People from Gilbert, Arizona
Portland Timbers (2001–2010) players
San Jose Earthquakes players
Soccer players from Arizona
Soccer players from Long Beach, California
Toronto FC players
United States men's international soccer players
A-League (1995–2004) players
USL First Division players
Yavapai Roughriders men's soccer players
American expatriate sportspeople in Canada